Aleksis Ahlqvist (born March 28, 1986) is a Finnish former professional ice hockey goaltender.

Ahlqvist played in the SM-liiga for JYP Jyväskylä, HIFK, KalPa and TPS.

References

External links

1986 births
Living people
HK Acroni Jesenice players
Dauphins d'Épinal players
ESV Kaufbeuren players
Finnish ice hockey goaltenders
HIFK (ice hockey) players
Iisalmen Peli-Karhut players
JYP Jyväskylä players
KalPa players
HC Keski-Uusimaa players
Kiekko-Vantaa players
Sportspeople from Jyväskylä
Scorpions de Mulhouse players
Timrå IK players
HC TPS players
21st-century Finnish people